Pusthakamlo Konni Pageelu Missing is a 2013 Telugu-language comedy film directed by Sajid Qureshi and Produced by Mohammad Sohail Ansari. The film is a remake of Balaji Tharaneetharan's 2012 film Naduvula Konjam Pakkatha Kaanom. It stars Sree, Supraja, Rahul, Satish and Mast Ali in vital roles. Gunwanth Sen scored the Music. The film released on 9 August 2013 and did decent business at the box office in spite of mixed reviews from the critics.

Plot
Vijay Kumar (Sri), Siva, Saleem and Balaji are good friends. Vijay happens to meet Sandhya (Supraja) and he falls in love with her. After a brief resistance, the parents of Vijay and Sandhya accept their love and agree to get them married.
Just a day before the wedding, Vijay gets injured while playing cricket. He takes a blow on his head and ends up with temporary memory loss. He loses all memory of events that happened in the last one year.
As the wedding hour approaches, Vijay's friends do everything and anything possible to bring back his memory. Will they succeed?
Will Vijay marry the girl he loves? That is the story of "Pusthakam lo Konni Pagelu Missing".

Cast
 Sri as Vijay
 Supraja as Sandhya
 Rahul as Shiva
 Mast Ali as Saleem
 Satish as Balaji
 Raghu Babu as Doctor

Soundtrack
The music was composed by Gunwanth Sen.

 "Ra Ra" - Deepu
 "Band Baaja" - Indu Sonali
 "Ayyo Ramare" - Gaana Bala
 "Saradaga" - Chinna Ponnu
 "Rabba" - Deepu

Critical reception
A critic from The Times of India wrote: "It's funny, but only in pieces, so a cheerful disposition might come in very handy to survive the not-so-funny parts, which is what most of the movie is filled with"
A critic from Deccan Chronicle wrote: "In fact, there is nothing more to the film than its trailer and promos. Too many small plots and repetitive dialogues put you off, So, give this film a miss".

References

2010s Telugu-language films
Telugu remakes of Tamil films
2013 films
Indian black comedy films